Kongsberg Defence & Aerospace is one of three business units of Kongsberg Gruppen (KONGSBERG) of Norway and the supplier of defence and space related systems and products, mainly anti-ship missiles, military communications, and command and weapons control systems for naval vessels and air-defence applications. Today, the company is probably best known abroad for its development/industrialisation and production of the first passive IR homing anti-ship missile of the western world, the Penguin, starting delivery in the early 1970s (when Kongsberg Defence & Aerospace was part of KONGSBERG's predecessor Kongsberg Våpenfabrikk). As of 2021, Kongsberg Defence & Aerospace had 3,500 employees.

Space related activities are conducted within Kongsberg Defence & Aerospace's Space & Surveillance division and Kongsberg Satellite Services. Notable space related products from Kongsberg Defence & Aerospace are the Booster Attachment and Release Mechanisms for ESA's Ariane 5. In the early 1990s Kongsberg Defence & Aerospace was involved with NASA's JPL and Germany's DASA in software development of the test/checkout system, as well as spacecraft hardware production, for the NASA/ESA Cassini-Huygens space probe. Kongsberg Defence & Aerospace has also delivered the Solar Array Drive Mechanism for ESA's Rosetta space probe.

On 22 November 2008 Norwegian Minister of Defence Anne-Grete Strøm-Erichsen opened a new Kongsberg Defence & Aerospace plant that will produce parts for the aircraft recently chosen as Norway's future fighter, the F-35 Lightning II.

Owners and ownership in other companies
It is fully owned by Kongsberg Gruppen ASA (a company that has a majority ownership by Norway's government.)

Its subsidiaries are Kongsberg Spacetec AS, Kongsberg Hungaria Kft, Kongsberg Norcontrol AS, Kongsberg Defence Corp., Kongsberg Defence Oy, Kongsberg Defence Sp. Z.O.O., Kongsberg Gallium Ltd. and Kongsberg Defence Ltd. Co.

It owns 50% of Kongsberg Satellite Services AS.

Toshiba-Kongsberg affair

In 1987, Tocibai Machine, a subsidiary of Toshiba, was accused of illegally selling CNC milling machines used to produce very quiet submarine propellers to the Soviet Union in violation of the CoCom agreement, an international embargo on certain countries to COMECON countries.  The Toshiba-Kongsberg scandal involved a subsidiary of Toshiba and the Norwegian company Kongsberg Vaapenfabrikk.  The incident strained relations between the United States and Japan, and resulted in the arrest and prosecution of two senior executives, as well as the imposition of sanctions on the company by both countries.

Products
Integrated Director Group (IDG) – radar system for target acquisition
 Penguin – passive heat seeking anti-ship missile
 Naval Strike Missile (NSM) – anti-ship missile with passive imaging heat seeker. Launched from ships and land vehicles.
 Joint Strike Missile (JSM) – sea- and land targets missile, launched from aircraft
 Trainers and simulators for different systems
 Mechanic and optomechanic for spaceships
 Protector (RWS)
 EriTac – tactical communication
 Multi-Role Radio (MRR) – field radios
 ComBatt – A system for battlefield administration
 Encryption Devices
 NORTaC-C2IS – command- and control systems for tactical operations in the army
 Composite Materials
 MSI-90 uboat system – command and arms control for submarines
 MSI 2005F – system for anti-submarine warfare, for use on frigates
 Senit 2000 – command system for Hauk-class MTBs
 MICOS – mine hunting and minesweeping
 Kongsberg Mission Planning System (KAMP) – tactical system for naval operations
 Minesniper – Remote mine destroyer
 SLAMRAAM – surface-to-air AIM-120 air defense missiles, both as a separate system in NASAMS and integrated with HAWK
 GBADOC – ground-based airspace control
 Software for E3A AWACS
 NASAMS 1-3

See also
Aviation in Norway

References

External links

 

Aerospace companies of Norway
Defence companies of Norway
Manufacturing companies of Norway
Companies established in 1814
Companies based in Buskerud
Defence
Norwegian companies established in 1814